Timothy Andrew Shaw (born November 8, 1957) is an American former Olympic medal-winning swimmer and water polo player. He swam at the 1976 Summer Olympics and played on the American team at the 1984 Summer Olympics. He is one of a handful of athletes to win Olympic medals in two different sports. Between 1974 and 1984, Shaw won two Olympic silver medals; three world championships; seven U.S. Amateur Athletic Union national titles; and three U.S. National Collegiate Athletic Association championships.

In 1974 in space of four days Shaw broke Mark Spitz's 200-meter freestyle world record, Rick DeMont's 400-meter freestyle world record and Stephen Holland's 1500-meter freestyle world record. Shaw appeared on the cover of Sports Illustrated magazine on August 4, 1975, after receiving the FINA Prize Eminence Award in 1974, representative of the greatest contribution to world aquatics. He was named World Swimmer of the Year in 1974 and 1975, and won the Sullivan Award in 1975 as the most outstanding amateur athlete in the United States after having won three gold medals at the World Aquatics Championships. Aged only 17 years and 256 days old, he became the youngest world champion in 1975, when he won the men’s 200m freestyle.

At the 1976 Olympics he only won one silver medal, in the 400-meter freestyle; he was completely shut out of his signature event, the 1500-meter freestyle. Although he did not compete in the finals for the 4×200 metres freestyle relay, he did contribute to the swimming team in the preliminaries. After the 1976 Olympics Shaw changed from swimming to water polo, a sport favored by his father, who was a water polo coach. Shaw missed the 1980 Olympics that were boycotted by the United States. He was a member of the 1984 U.S. water polo team that was undefeated in Olympic competition, but was awarded the silver medal because the Yugoslav team, with an identical record, scored four more goals overall.

In 1989 Shaw was inducted into the International Swimming Hall of Fame, and in 1991, he was inducted into the USA Water Polo Hall of Fame. He married around 1985, and as of 2003 he lives in Newport Beach, California, with wife Joanne, and children Christina, Jennifer, and Thomas.

See also
 List of athletes with Olympic medals in different sports
 List of Olympic medalists in swimming (men)
 List of Olympic medalists in water polo (men)
 List of World Aquatics Championships medalists in swimming (men)
 World record progression 200 metres freestyle
 World record progression 400 metres freestyle
 World record progression 800 metres freestyle
 World record progression 1500 metres freestyle
 World record progression 4 × 200 metres freestyle relay
 List of members of the International Swimming Hall of Fame

References

External links
 

1957 births
Living people
American male freestyle swimmers
World record setters in swimming
James E. Sullivan Award recipients
Long Beach State Beach swimmers
American male water polo players
Olympic medalists in water polo
Olympic silver medalists for the United States in swimming
Sportspeople from Long Beach, California
Swimmers at the 1976 Summer Olympics
World Aquatics Championships medalists in swimming
Medalists at the 1984 Summer Olympics
Medalists at the 1976 Summer Olympics
Wilson Classical High School alumni
Pan American Games medalists in water polo
Pan American Games gold medalists for the United States
Swimmers at the 1983 Pan American Games
Water polo players at the 1984 Summer Olympics
American water polo coaches
Medalists at the 1983 Pan American Games